Bowen (formerly Bowensburg) is a village in southeast Hancock County, Illinois, United States. The population was 494 at the 2010 census.

Geography
Bowen is located in southeastern Hancock County at  (40.232035, -91.062694). Illinois Route 61 passes through the center of town, entering from the east on 5th Street and leaving to the south on Worrell Street. Illinois Route 94 enters from the north on Worrell Street and leaves to the south with IL 61. To the north, IL 94 leads  to Carthage, the county seat. IL 61 leads east  to Augusta, and the two highways lead south six miles before splitting.

Demographics

As of the census of 2000, there were 535 people, 205 households, and 143 families residing in the village. The racial makeup of the village was 99.81% White and 0.19% Native American. Hispanic or Latino of any race were 0.19% of the population.

There were 205 households, out of which 35.1% had children under the age of 18 living with them, 55.6% were married couples living together, 11.2% had a female householder with no husband present, and 30.2% were non-families. 24.4% of all households were made up of individuals, and 14.1% had someone living alone who was 65 years of age or older.  The average household size was 2.61 and the average family size was 3.12.

In the village, the population was spread out, with 30.5% under the age of 18, 5.6% from 18 to 24, 30.1% from 25 to 44, 17.2% from 45 to 64, and 16.6% who were 65 years of age or older.  The median age was 33 years. For every 100 females, there were 91.1 males.  For every 100 females age 18 and over, there were 88.8 males.

The median income for a household in the village was $29,091, and the median income for a family was $36,429. Males had a median income of $30,764 versus $22,000 for females. The per capita income for the village was $13,241.  About 13.0% of families and 16.3% of the population were below the poverty line, including 25.9% of those under age 18 and 7.1% of those age 65 or over.

References

Villages in Hancock County, Illinois
Villages in Illinois